Stefano Callegari (born 6 January 1997) is an Argentine professional footballer who plays as a centre-back for Agropecuario, on loan from Newell's Old Boys.

Career
Callegari's career got underway with Newell's Old Boys. After appearing on the first-team substitutes bench in December 2017 versus Rosario Central, Callegari featured in his first professional match four months later during a home victory over Tigre on 31 March 2018.

Career statistics
.

References

External links

1997 births
Living people
Footballers from Rosario, Santa Fe
Argentine sportspeople of Italian descent
Argentine footballers
Association football defenders
Newell's Old Boys footballers
Club Atlético Platense footballers
Club Agropecuario Argentino players
Argentine Primera División players
Primera Nacional players